The Alta Toquima  Wilderness is a protected wilderness area in the Toquima Range of Nye County, in the central section of the state of Nevada in the western United States. The Mount Jefferson Research Natural Area protects  around Mount Jefferson, the highest peak in the Toquima Range and Nye County. The Mount Jefferson Research Natural Area is one of the most unusual environments in the United States, due to its extreme alpine conditions. Wildlife is plentiful in the Wilderness, including bighorn sheep, deer, grouse, chukar and native trout.

See also 
 List of U.S. Wilderness Areas
 Wilderness Act

References

External links
 Humboldt-Toiyabe National Forest
 NevadaWilderness.org
 Wilderness.net

Humboldt–Toiyabe National Forest
Wilderness areas of Nevada
Protected areas of Nye County, Nevada
Protected areas established in 1989
1989 establishments in Nevada